The 2013 Kilkenny Senior Hurling Championship is the 119th staging of the Kilkenny Senior Hurling Championship since its establishment in 1887. The championship began on 14 September 2013 and ended on 27 October 2013.

Ballyhale Shamrocks were the defending champions, however, they were defeated in the semi-final stage. Clara won the title, following a 1-15 to 2-10 defeat of Carrickshock in the final.

Team changes

To Championship

Promoted from the Kilkenny Intermediate Hurling Championship
 Clara

From Championship

Relegated to the Kilkenny Intermediate Hurling Championship
 Dunnamaggin

Team summaries

Results

First round

Relegation play-off

Quarter-finals

Semi-finals

Final

Championship statistics

Top scorers

Top scorers overall

Top scorers in a single game

External links
2013 Kilkenny Senior Hurling Championship fixtures and results

References

Kilkenny Senior Hurling Championship
Kilkenny Senior Hurling Championship